The Rona Tranby Trust  is an Australian-based not-for-profit organisation established in September 1991 to support the recording and preservation of Indigenous Australian oral history. This includes the granting of Awards to Indigenous Australian elders, organisations and community groups.

Rona Tranby Trust projects are selected and grants awarded through the Rona Tranby Award & Collection. Between 1991 and 2012 the Rona Tranby Award & Collection has funded projects across Australia. The Rona Tranby Award & Collection is managed by Music & Opera Singers Trust Limited (MOST®).

Rona Tranby Award Recipients

References

External links 
 Rona Tranby Trust website
 Music & Opera Singers Trust Limited (MOST®) website

Organisations serving Indigenous Australians